Veselin Đuranović (17 May 1925 – 30 August 1997) was a Yugoslav communist politician.

Biography
Đuranović was born near Danilovgrad, in what was then the Kingdom of Serbs, Croats and Slovenes. He served as the chairman of the executive council of Montenegro from 1963 to 1966. He then served as chairman of the Central Committee of the League of Communists of Montenegro from 1968 to 77. In 1977, he moved into Yugoslav national politics, serving as chairman of the executive council (prime minister) of Yugoslavia from 1977 to 82.

Đuranović made a state visit to Czechoslovakia in October 1977, where he met with Prime Minister Lubomír Štrougal.

He then served as chairman of the Presidency of Montenegro from 1982 to 1983. He became the member for Montenegro of the collective presidency of Yugoslavia, and served as chairman of the Presidency of Yugoslavia from 1984 to 1985. In 1989, Montenegro's entire government and Communist League Central Committee resigned, including Đuranović.

Post-presidency
After the breakup of Yugoslavia he retired to his home village of Martinići, where he died, aged 72.

See also
League of Communists of Montenegro
President of the League of Communists of Montenegro

External links

References

 

|-

1925 births
1997 deaths
People from Danilovgrad
Presidents of Montenegro
Montenegrin atheists
Presidents of the Federal Executive Council of Yugoslavia
League of Communists of Montenegro politicians
Central Committee of the League of Communists of Yugoslavia members
Montenegrin communists
Recipients of the Order of the Hero of Socialist Labour